Chloroclystis pyrsodonta is a moth in the family Geometridae. It was described by Turner in 1922. It is found in Australia (Queensland). It has also been recorded from Fiji.

References

External links

Moths described in 1922
pyrsodonta